Roman Vögeli (born 13 March 1985) is a Czech-Swiss former professional tennis player. A citizen of both countries, he competed as a Czech during his playing career and now coaches in Switzerland.

Vögeli grew up in the Czech Republic. When he was 14 his parents moved to Switzerland but he remained in the Czech Republic to attend a sports school run by the country's tennis association. He was the second ranked player in his class behind future Wimbledon finalist Tomáš Berdych.

On the professional tour, Vögeli had a career best singles ranking of 410 and made an ATP Tour main draw appearance as a qualifier at the 2006 Suisse Open Gstaad. His only ITF Futures singles title came at Jūrmala in 2008. He however won 16 ITF Futures titles in doubles and had a best doubles ranking of 412 in the world.

ITF Futures titles

Singles: (1)

Doubles: (16)

References

External links
 
 

1985 births
Living people
Czech male tennis players
Czech emigrants to Switzerland